Qoo10 is a Southeast Asian e-commerce platform, formerly known as GMarket, headquartered in Singapore. It operates localized online marketplaces across Singapore, Indonesia, Malaysia, mainland China, and Hong Kong, and on one international online marketplace. It optimizes its platform and services for small and medium enterprise merchants.

History 
Qoo10 was founded as a subsidiary of Qoo10 Pte. Ltd., in 2010 by Giosis Pte. Ltd., a joint venture between Gmarket founder Ku Young Bae and eBay.

Gmarket was founded in South Korea in 2000 as a subsidiary of Interpark. In December 2007, Gmarket was established in Japan. Gmarket was next established in Singapore in December 2008.

In April 2009, Ku Young Bae sold Gmarket to eBay.

In May 2010, Giosis Pte. Ltd. was established as a joint venture between Ku and eBay to further develop Singapore and Japan marketplaces, and expand in the region.

In March and April 2011, Gmarket was established in Indonesia and Malaysia respectively. In September, Gmarket launched its global marketplace.

In May 2012, Gmarket was rebranded as Qoo10.

In January 2013, Qoo10 was established in China.

In January 2015, Qoo10 was established in Hong Kong.. In July, Giosis raises US$82.1 million in series a funding from Singapore Press Holdings, eBay, Oak Investment Partners, Saban Capital Group, Brookside Capital, and UVM 2 Venture Investments The company stated their intention to use the funds to accelerate Qoo10's technology growth and service development, while investing in additional infrastructure and talent acquisition.

In April 2018, eBay completed acquisition of Giosis Private Limited and its Japan properties, including , which will operate independently from other Qoo10 sites. eBay relinquished its stakes in Giosis' non-Japanese businesses, which moved under newly established parent company, Qoo10 Pvt. Ltd.

In October 2019, Qoo10 acquired ShopClues, an Indian e-commerce platform.

Awards and recognition 
Qoo10 was named as the “Best Online Retailer” at AsiaOne’s People Choices Awards, 2015 & 2016.
In January 2016, Qoo10 was ranked 4th among 259 local and global brands with the most positive image, just after Singapore Airlines, Apple iPhone and WhatsApp.
In 2016, Qoo10 was voted “Best Electronics Shopping Portal” at Tech Awards 2016 organized by Singaporean tech magazine HWM and HardwareZone.
In 2017, CGS-CIMB and Euromonitor statistics figured Qoo10 Singapore captured 32.6% of market share in Singapore's e-commerce market.
Data insights from metasearch engine iPrice showed that Qoo10 consistently holds the top spot for monthly user website visits among e-commerce platforms in Singapore.

References

External links 
 Qoo10 Singapore

Online marketplaces of Singapore
Internet properties established in 2010
2010 establishments in Singapore